Dushev, Douchev, Dusev or Dušev is a Slavic masculine surname, its feminine counterpart is Dusheva, Doucheva, Duseva or Duševa. It may refer to
Andrian Dushev (born 1970), Bulgarian sprint canoer, husband of Natasa
Natasa Dusev-Janics (born 1982), Yugoslavian-born Hungarian sprint canoer
Ognyana Petrova-Dusheva (born 1964), Bulgarian sprint canoer

Bulgarian-language surnames